The Bismarck giant rat (Uromys neobritannicus) is a species of rodent in the family Muridae.
It is endemic to the island of New Britain, Papua New Guinea.

References

Uromys
Rodents of New Guinea
Rodents of Papua New Guinea
Mammals described in 1935
Taxonomy articles created by Polbot
Endemic fauna of Papua New Guinea
Fauna of New Britain
Taxa named by George Henry Hamilton Tate
Taxa named by Richard Archbold